Chemiluminescent immunoassay (CLIA) is a type of immunoassay employing chemiluminescence.

See also
 Enzyme-linked immunosorbent assay (ELISA)

References

Immunologic tests